The Poland men's national under-20 basketball team is a national basketball team of Poland, administered by the Polish Basketball Federation. It represents the country in international men's under-20 basketball competitions.

FIBA U20 European Championship participations

See also
Poland men's national basketball team
Poland men's national under-19 basketball team
Poland women's national under-20 basketball team

References

External links
Archived records of Poland team participations

Basketball in Poland
Basketball
Men's national under-20 basketball teams